Kergin may refer to:

Kergin, Iran, a village in Kerman Province, Iran
Herbert Frederick Kergin (1885-1954), Canadian political figure
Michael Kergin (b. 1942), Canadian diplomat
William Thomas Kergin (c. 1876–1961), Canadian political figure